Demoiselle may refer to:
 Demoiselle crane, a crane (bird) of central Asia
 Demoiselle, Calopterygidae, a family of damselflies, in the suborder Zygoptera
 Demoiselle Stakes, a horse race held in New York
 Demoiselle Creek, New Brunswick
 Santos-Dumont Demoiselle, an early aircraft
 Some species of fish in the damselfish family (Pomacentridae), especially:
 The New Zealand demoiselle, Chromis dispilus
 Memeskia, Miami Indian chief (c. 1695 – 1752), known by the French as "La Demoiselle"

See also
 Les Demoiselles d'Avignon, a 1907 painting by Pablo Picasso
 Les Demoiselles de Rochefort, a 1967 musical film 
 The Damoiselle, a 17th-century play by Richard Brome
 Mademoiselle (disambiguation)
Damsel (disambiguation)